Macrotristriini is a tribe of cicadas in the family Cicadidae. There are at least 2 genera and 20 described species in Macrotristriini, all found in Australia.

Genera
These two genera belong to the tribe Macrotristriini:
 Illyria Moulds, 1985 c g
 Macrotristria Stål, 1870 c g
Data sources: i = ITIS, c = Catalogue of Life, g = GBIF, b = Bugguide.net

References

Further reading

External links

 

 
Cicadinae
Hemiptera tribes